An interspecies friendship is a nonsexual bond that is formed between animals of different species. Numerous cases of interspecies friendships among wild and domesticated animals have been reported and documented with photography and video. Domestication of animals has led to interspecies friendships between species that would never naturally exist together. In many cases of interspecies friendship, the species are not normally seen together, and sometimes, one is of a species that ordinarily preys on the other in nature.

The concept of interspecies friendship is similar to that of mutualism in that two individuals from different species exist in a relationship where each organism benefits from the activity of the other. Reasons for the formation of interspecies friendships include domestication, interspecies communication, mutually beneficial exchanges, desire for social bonding, protection, or is often unknown.

Friendships between humans and other animals

Dogs 

The relationship between a human and a household dog (Canis lupus familiaris) is quite common and said to be similar to the relationship seen between a parent and child. Many people agree that there is an emotional bond between themselves and their dog. An important indicator of the bond between a dog and its caregiver can be seen through separation and reunion incidences. The behaviour of the dog including approach latency and the frequency of initiating physical contact varies according to how familiar the dog is with the person. This can be viewed as a snapshot of their relationship. Behaviours such as tail wagging, lip licking, body shaking and vocalization also indicate this.

The relationship between humans and dogs is so impactful that therapy dogs are a common practice. From hospitals to schools, dogs help comfort humans.

Cats 

Friendships between household cats (Felis catus) and humans are also very common. The relationship between cats and humans dates back over 10,000 years. Cats even had great influence in ancient Egypt. Today, cats live in many countries and are the most popular choice of pet. Cat owners often consider their cat as an integrated part of their family and indicate that they are easy to care for and engage in social behaviours such as allowing humans to hold, pet and play with them. Mutual affection and bonding is displayed between cats and their owners, indicating a sense of friendship.

Horses 

Friendships between humans and domesticated horses (E. ferus) are often observed and occur when the horse is willing to allow the person into its flight distance and personal space through friendly interactions such as grooming, scratching and rubbing. Horses are social animals and once a person is accepted into their personal space, they become a part of their social system. A domesticated horse will work hard for praise from its human partner and can be easily trained to respond to human commands. Many people report strong feelings of friendship with their horse and believe that their horse considers them to be its friend, protector, and caretaker.

Non-domesticated animals 
Interspecies friendships have been displayed between humans and non-domesticated animals. Some examples include:
 The interspecies friendship between zoologist Dian Fossey and a group of gorillas. Fossey developed relationships with the gorillas she studied and after years of being away from them, they recognized and remembered her when she returned. After their reunion, the gorillas engaged in amicable behaviour with Fossey such as direct eye contact, sniffing, crooning, resting beside each other and embracing one another.
 The relationship between Barbara Smuts and a baboon troop. Over the course of many interactions between Smuts and the baboons, eventually the baboons treated her as if she was a part of their troop. Smuts would comfortably rest with them, exchange friendly glances and felt safe amongst them.
 Friendly encounters have been observed between gray whales and humans. Gray whales seem to enjoy when humans pat them alongside boats. During these human-whale interactions, the whales are generally timid and gentle.

Friendships between non-human animals

Dogs and cats 

Dogs (Canis lupus familaris) and cats (Felis catus) that coexist in close quarters are two unrelated species that often display companionship towards each other. Many coexisting dogs and cats exhibit friendly relationships involving behaviours such as playing and sleeping together, grooming each other and understanding differences in body language and communication. Dogs and cats often engage in mutual nose sniffing which is a form of greeting displayed in cats that is not normally observed in dogs. Dogs may acquire this behaviour from the understanding of cat communication signals.

Other examples 

There are many documented instances of unusual interspecies friendships. Some examples include:

 Three large Waders including a long-billed curlew, whimbrel and marbled godwit kept each other company every winter in Vancouver for many years.
 Near Cincinnati, three northern cardinal and four robin nestlings shared a nest and the parents of the nestlings worked together to bring food to their offspring.
 A horse and wild turkey displayed friendly behaviour in which the horse would bow down his head and allow the turkey to climb on his back.
 A ram and a blind cow exhibited interspecies friendship in which the ram would protect the cow by making sure she did not bump into anything and feeding beside her every day. When the cow gave birth to a calf, the ram exhibited these protective behaviours on the calf as well.
 A cow and a blind mule formed an interspecies friendship in the Black Forest Animal Sanctuary. When the species were introduced, the steer automatically assumed a protective role over the blind mule by staying near her, sleeping next to her, playing with her and leading her around the pasture to protect her from injuries.
 Coyotes are often known to hunt badgers, however, mutualistic relationships can develop between these rival species. Coyotes and badgers engage in ground squirrel hunting together in which the badgers dig into ground squirrel nests and hunt any they come across. Ground squirrels that manage to flee the site are captured by coyotes nearby. This hunting behaviour benefits both the coyotes and badgers because it allows each species to obtain food. The coyotes initiate ground squirrel hunting through friendly behaviours such as play-bowing, tail-wagging and scampering. The badgers respond to this behaviour even though they are not known to initiate these behaviours with other badgers. After the hunt, the animals often rest together with their bodies in close proximity or touching.
 A timber wolf and two goats were kept in enclosures next to each other in the San Diego Zoo and engaged in a playful relationship which involved racing each other back and forth by the fence separating them. They would also rest next to each other by the fence and the wolf would try to lick the goats' faces. They would be let outside the same time each day so that they could play together and the wolf would only go inside at night if the goats were already inside.
A miniature horse and farm goose were rescued together and formed an interspecies friendship in Bucks County, Pennsylvania. The horse was recovering from infection, which made the farm goose more protective of him. The goose would show protective behavior when staff would treat the horse.
Red-billed oxpeckers and black rhinos have a symbiotic relationship. The oxpeckers feed on the bugs found on rhinos and the oxpeckers warn the rhinos about nearby poachers.
A social relationship was observed between a narwhal and a group of beluga whales in the St. Lawrence River. The narwhal had been accepted into the group of beluga whales and continued to travel with them.
A relationship between canines and a silkie chicken, coyote and a pygmy owl have all been documented.

Why interspecies friendships form

Domestication 
Domestication is defined as a multi-generational relationship in which one group of organisms assumes a significant degree of influence over the reproduction and care of another group to secure a more predictable supply of resources from that second group.

In the previous 11,000 years, humans have brought a wide range of species into domestication to use as livestock, working animals, household pets, and companions.  The influence of human behaviour on domesticated animals has led to many species having learned to co-exist - sometimes leading to the formation of an interspecies friendship. For example, interspecies friendships are often observed in humans with their domesticated pets and in pets that live in the same household such as cats and dogs.

Interspecies communication 
Interspecies communication can form the basis of an interspecies friendship because it facilitates mutualism and bonds between animals. Species can communicate to each other both verbally and non-verbally as seen in human-dog communication. The communication exhibited between dogs and humans allow friendships to form which is often displayed through social bonding activities such as play. Interspecific communication is an effective way of forming mutuality and interspecies friendships in the wild which often involves different species warning each other about potential danger approaching. Species of monkeys have been observed to communicate with each other through their alarm calls leading to mutuality between the counterparts. In particular, West African Diana monkeys and Campbell's monkeys seem to understand and react to the alarm calls of the other species and form associations with each other through mutual protection.

Mutualism 
Mutualism can contribute to the formation of interspecies friendships because it involves a pair of organisms experiencing mutually beneficial exchanges with each other which may lead to a long-lasting bond. The mutualistic relationship observed between coyotes and badgers after hunting ground squirrels together is an example of mutualism developing into an unlikely interspecies friendship. Interspecies friendships often form between humans and domesticated animals through mutualism in which the human gains something beneficial from their pet and the pet gains something beneficial from the human. This is often observed in human-canine friendships in which dogs benefit by being cared for and offered love and companionship from humans while humans benefit by receiving companionship, loyalty and love from their dogs. Mutualistic relationships can be observed even in the smallest of critters like ants and aphids. Ants deter predators from aphids and aphids produce honeydew for the ants to drink.

Protection 
Protective behaviour exhibited from one species onto another can lead to an interspecies friendship as it allows the formation of a bond to occur between species. This is often observed in interspecies adoptions in which one species  "adopts" another that is orphaned or hurt. For example, an infant marmoset was adopted by capuchin monkeys and the marmoset became socially included and protected in their group. Other examples include a ram protecting a blind cow and a steer protecting a blind mule. In each circumstance, interspecies friendships are formed after the protectors assumed protective roles.

Social bonding 
Many species seek out social bonding with other species which often involves play behaviours. Play can act as a form of communication between companions in which the participants mutually understand that the interaction is playful and pleasurable. Play is specifically fundamental to interactions between humans and their non-human companions such as play exhibited in human-canine bonding. Human-canine play requires that both the human and dog communicate to understand the situation and goal of the game through their actions. Social bonding is observed in many interspecies interactions such as those between humans and their household pets, humans and primates, and many other animals in the wild. Since social bonding involves communication and interactions between different species, it can lead to the development of interspecies friendships.

Trait selection and convergent evolution 
Animals often portray many similar characteristics displayed by humans. There looms large belief that while both humans and animals evolve simultaneously, domesticated animals have benefitted the most from human-animal relationships because they have increased in population much further than they ever would have in a natural occurrence because of their selected "human-like" characteristics. The selection of behavioural skills provides a typical environment for :convergent evolution.

Canis lupus familiaris 

There is a wide range of shared general and specific social skills between humans and dogs including functional and behavioural traits. Sociality, the ability to perform synchronized behaviour and complex constructive skills have each been previously displayed in both dogs and humans. For example, qualities of sociality include lifelong attachment, reduced intra-group aggression, enhanced cooperation. Whereas, synchronized behaviours include imitation, hypnosis and dance and complex constructive skills include mimesis and language. Dogs display specific social skills during interaction with humans for their benefit. Advancement in attachment skills for the dogs enables them further benefit from humans by gaining valuable information, protection and help.

Animals that have evolved social skills gained close integration with humans and their community resulting in more successful species. Human-dog relationships are the most common interspecies friendships, resulting in dogs becoming one of the most successful mammalian species to exist.

See also
 Dog–cat relationship
 Human–canine bond
 A Moose for Jessica
Symbiosis

References

Animal cognition
Friendship
Interpersonal relationships